Ionic Coulomb blockade (ICB) is an electrostatic phenomenon that appears in ionic transport through mesoscopic electro-diffusive systems (artificial nanopores and biological ion channels) and manifests itself as oscillatory dependences of the conductance on the fixed charge  in the pore ( or on the external voltage , or on the bulk concentration ).

ICB represents an ion-related counterpart of the better-known electronic Coulomb blockade (ECB) that is observed in quantum dots. Both ICB and ECB arise from quantisation of the electric charge and from an electrostatic exclusion principle and they share in common a number of effects and underlying physical mechanisms.

ICB effects appear in tiny pores whose self-capacitance  is so small that the charging energy  of a single ion becomes large compared to the thermal energy per particle.

The ICB model claims that  is a primary determinant of conduction and selectivity for particular ions, and the predicted oscillations in conductance and an associated Coulomb staircase of channel occupancy vs  are expected to be strong effects in the cases of divalent ions or trivalent ions.

Some effects, now recognised as belonging to ICB, were discovered and considered earlier in precursor papers on electrostatics-governed conduction mechanisms in channels and nanopores.

The manifestations of ICB have been observed in water-filled sub-nanometre pores through a 2D MoS2 monolayer, revealed by Brownian dynamics (BD) simulations of calcium conductance bands in narrow channels, and account for a diversity of effects seen in biological ion channels. ICB predictions have also been confirmed by a mutation study of divalent blockade in the NaChBac bacterial channel.

Model

Generic electrostatic model of channel/nanopore 
ICB effects may be derived on the basis of a simplified electrostatics/Brownian dynamics model of a nanopore or of the selectivity filter of an ion channel. The model represents the channel/pore as a charged hole through a water-filled protein hub embedded in the membrane. Its fixed charge  is considered as a uniform, centrally placed, rigid ring (Fig.1). The channel is assumed to have geometrical parameters length nm and radius nm, allowing for the single-file movement of partially hydrated ions.

The model represents the water and protein as continuous media with dielectric constants  and  respectively. The mobile ions are described as discrete entities with valence  and of radius , moving stochastically through the pore, governed by the self-consistently coupled Poisson's electrostatic equation and Langevin stochastic equation.

The model is applicable to both cationic and anionic biological ion channels and to artificial nanopores.

Electrostatics 
The  mobile ion is assumed to be partially hydrated  (typically retaining its first hydration shell) and carrying charge  where  is the elementary charge (e.g. the  ion with ). The model allows one to derive the pore and ion parameters satisfying the barrier-less permeation conditions, and to do so from basic electrostatics taking account of charge quantisation.

The potential energy  of a channel/pore containing  ions can be decomposed into electrostatic energy , dehydration energy,  and ion-ion local interaction energy :

Resonant barrier-less conduction 

In thermal and particle equilibrium with bulk reservoirs, the entire system has a common value of chemical potential  (the Fermi level in other contexts). The free energy needed for the entry of a new ion to the channel is defined by the excess chemical potential  which (ignoring an entropy term ) can be written as  where  is the charging energy (self-energy barrier) of an incoming ion and is its affinity (i.e. energy of attraction to the binding site ).

In selective ion channels, the favoured ionic species passes through the channel almost at the rate of free diffusion, despite the strong affinity to the binding site. This conductivity-selectivty paradox has been explained as being a consequence of selective barrier-less conduction.

Oscillations of conductance 

Electrostatic blockade points  correspond to minima in the ground state energy of the pore (Fig.3C). The  points are equivalent to neutralisation points where .

For , in a typical ion channel geometry, and ICB becomes strong. Consequently, plots of the BD-simulated Ca^2+current  vs  exhibit multi-ion conduction bands - strong Coulomb blockade oscillations between minima and maxima (Fig.3A)).

Such pores are blockaded for ions of either sign.

Coulomb staircase  

The shape of the staircase is described by the Fermi-Dirac (FD) distribution, similarly to the Coulomb staircases of quantum dots. The saturated FD statistics of occupancy is equivalent to the Langmuir isotherm or to Michaelis-Menten kinetics.

It is the factor  that gives rise to the concentration-related shift in the staircase seen in Fig.3B.

Shift of singular points 

Addition of the partial excess chemical potentials  coming from different sources (including dehydration, local binding, volume exclusion etc.) leads to the ICB barrier-less condition  leads to a proper shift in the ICB resonant points , described by a "shift equation" : i.e. the additional energy contributions  lead to shifts in the resonant barrier-less point .

The more important of these shifts (excess potentials) are:

  A concentration-related shift  arising from the bulk entropy
  A dehydration-related shift , arising from partial dehydration penalty 
 A local binding-related shift , coming from energy of local binding  and surface effects.

In artificial nanopores

Sub-nm MoS2pores 
Following its prediction based on analytic theory and molecular dynamics simulations, experimental evidence for ICB emerged from experiments on monolayer MoS2 pierced by a single nm nanopore. Highly non-Ohmic conduction was observed between aqueous ionic solutions on either side of the membrane. In particular, for low voltages across the membrane, the current remained close to zero, but it rose abruptly when a threshold of about mV was exceeded. This was interpreted as complete ionic Coulomb blockade of current in the (uncharged) nanopore due to the large potential barrier at low voltages. But the application of larger voltages pulled the barrier down, producing accessible states into which transitions could occur, thus leading to conduction.

In biological ion channels 
The realisation that ICB could occur in biological ion channels accounted for several experimentally observed features of selectivity, including:

Valence selectivity 
Valence selectivity is the channel's ability to discriminate between ions of different valence , wherein e.g. a calcium channel favours  ions over  ions by a factor of up to 1000×. Valence selectivity has been attributed variously to pure electrostatics,
or to a charge space competition mechanism,
or to a snug fit of the ion to ligands,
or to quantised dehydration.
In the ICB model, valence selectivity arises from electrostatics, namely from -dependence of the value of  needed to provide for barrier-less conduction.

Correspondingly, the ICB model provides explanations of why site-directed mutations that alter  can destroy the channel by blockading it, or can alter its selectivity from favouring  ions to favouring  ions, or vice versa .

Divalent blockade 
Divalent (e.g. ) blockade of monovalent (e.g. ) currents is observed in some types of ion channels. Namely,  ions in a pure sodium solution pass unimpeded through a calcium channel, but are blocked by tiny (nM) extracellular concentrations of  ions. ICB provides a transparent explanation of both the phenomenon itself and of the Langmuir-isotherm-shape of the current vs.  attenuation curve, deriving them from the strong affinity and an FD distribution of Ca^2+ions.  Vice versa, appearance divalent blockade presents strong evidence in favour of ICB

Similarly, ICB can account for the divalent (Iodide I^2-) blockade that has been observed in biological chloride (Cl-)-selective channels.

Special features

Comparisons between ICB and ECB 
ICB and ECB should be considered as two versions of the same fundamental electrostatic phenomenon. Both ICB and ECB are based on charge quantisation and on the finite single-particle charging energy , resulting in close similarity of the governing equations and manifestations of these closely related phenomena. Nonetheless, there are important distinctions between ICB and ECB: their similarities and differences are summarised in Table 1.

Particular cases 
Coulomb blockade can also appear in superconductors; in such a case the free charge carriers are Cooper pairs 

In addition, Pauli spin blockade  represents a special kind of Coulomb blockade, connected with Pauli exclusion principle.

Quantum analogies 
Despite appearing in completely classical systems, ICB exhibits some phenomena reminiscent of quantum-mechanics (QM). They arise because the charge/entity discreteness of the ions leads to quantisation of the energy  spectrum and hence to the QM-analogies:

 Noise-driven diffusive motion provides for escape over barriers, comparable to QM-tunnelling in ECB.
 The particular FD shape of the  occupancy vs  plays a significant role in the ICB explanation of the divalent blockade phenomenon. The appearance of an FD distribution in the diffusion of classical particles obeying an exclusion principle, has been demonstrated rigorously.

See also 
Coulomb blockade
Ion channel
Brownian dynamics
Nanopore
Binding selectivity
Fermi–Dirac statistics
Electrostatics
Quantisation of charge
Elementary charge

References 

Nanoelectronics
Quantum electronics
Mesoscopic physics